Ardisia squamulosa is a species of plant in the family Primulaceae. It is endemic to the Philippines. It is used to flavor fish.

References

Endemic flora of the Philippines
squamulosa
Vulnerable plants
Taxonomy articles created by Polbot